Nova Express is an album composed by John Zorn, inspired by William Burroughs prose. The album refers to four books by Burroughs Nova Express, The Ticket That Exploded, Dead Fingers Talk and Port of Saints in the track listing. Nova Express was released in March 2011 on the Tzadik label.

Track listing
All compositions by John Zorn

Personnel
Joey Baron - drums
Trevor Dunn - bass
John Medeski - piano
Kenny Wollesen - vibes

References

Albums produced by John Zorn
John Zorn albums
Tzadik Records albums
2011 albums